Porte may refer to:

Sublime Porte, the central government of the Ottoman empire
Porte, Piedmont, a municipality in the Piedmont region of Italy
John Cyril Porte, British/Irish aviator
Richie Porte, Australian professional cyclist who competes for Team BMC
Toyota Porte, an automobile

See also
Port (disambiguation)
Portes (disambiguation)